Türk Telekom GSK is a sports club located in Ankara, Turkey. The club mostly referred incorrectly as Türk Telekomspor.  The football team plays their home games in Ankara Türk Telekom Stadı in Ankara. The club was founded in 1954 as Telspor and its previous name was PTT, and its colors were yellow and black. PTT had played in the First Level. It also has a basketball team, Türk Telekom B.K., which plays in the Turkish Basketball League. Türk Telekomspor played Turkish Basketball League between 1966–1973 and 1991–1996 as PTT. They changed their name as currently one in 1996. Their football section ceased to exist with the end of the 2010–11 season.

Squad

Participations for football team
 Turkish Super League: 1960–71, 1972–73
 TFF First League: 1971–72, 1973–74, 1983–94, 1995–98, 2000–01, 2003–07
 TFF Second League: 1974–75, 1994–95, 1998–00, 2001–03, 2007–11 (Football section was closed in 2011)
 Turkish Regional Amateur League: 1975–83

External links
Profile on TTF website

 
Association football clubs established in 1954
Football clubs in Ankara
1954 establishments in Turkey
Süper Lig clubs